Lauren Paolini (born August 22, 1987) is an American retired volleyball player. She was part of the United States national team in the 2010 FIVB World Championship and she also won the gold medal in the 2015 Pan American Games.  She played with University of Texas at Austin.

References

1987 births
Living people
American women's volleyball players
Texas Longhorns women's volleyball players
Middle blockers
Place of birth missing (living people)
Volleyball players at the 2015 Pan American Games
Pan American Games gold medalists for the United States
Pan American Games medalists in volleyball
Medalists at the 2015 Pan American Games
21st-century American women